Terrance Williams (born October 14, 1965) is a former American football defensive back in the National Football League (NFL).

Williams was drafted by the New York Jets in the 2nd round (37th overall) of the 1988 NFL Draft, where he played for two years until a knee injury ended his playing career. He was released by the Jets in April 1991. His All-America talent on the track earned him a scholarship to play football at Bethune-Cookman College in 1984, where he played under then head coach Larry Little.

Williams currently resides in Daytona Beach, where he has served as the defensive backs coach at Bethune–Cookman University since 1999.

References

1965 births
Living people
American football defensive backs
New York Jets players
Bethune–Cookman Wildcats football players
People from Homestead, Florida
Sportspeople from Miami-Dade County, Florida